Nordsjælland Håndbold is a handball club, based in Helsinge, Denmark. Currently, Nordsjælland Håndbold competes in the men's Danish Handball League, and plays its home matches in Helsinge-Hallen in Helsinge. The women's team is competing in the third-best tier of the women's Danish league system.

History
The club was founded in 2006, when Team Helsinge and Hillerød HK merged their first teams to create the new club. The following season, the team gained promotion to the Danish Handball League.

Team

Staff

Current squad
Squad for the 2022-23 season

Goalkeeper
 1  Frederik Andersson
 16  Magnus Kjærsgaard Petersen
 29  Jimmi Andersen

Wingers
LW
 14  Rasmus Madsbøll
 20  Malthe Vibe
 25  Jeppe Cieslak

RW
 3  Carl-Emil Haunstrup
 10  Andreas Dysseholm

Pivots
 5  Julius Mørch
 9  Hakan Sahin
 21  Tim Hjorth Rantala

Back players
LB
 13  Gustav Bruun
 17  Nichlas Hald
 44  Jeppe Villumsen

CB
 2  Tobias Eiberg Jørgensen (c)
 18  Magnus Kronborg
 42  Matias Campbell

RB
 7  Kristian Olsen
 57  Nikolaj Larsson

Transfers
Transfers for the 2023-24 season

Joining
  Halldór Jóhann Sigfússon (Assistant coach) (from  TTH Holstebro)
  Justin Müller (CB) (from  TUSEM Essen)
  Oliver Klarskov Knudsen (CB) (from  TMS Ringsted)
  Jonas Raundahl (P) (from  Fredericia HK)

Leaving
  Simon Dahl (Head coach) (to  Aalborg Håndbold)
  Frederik Andersson (GK)
  Tobias Eiberg Jørgensen (CB)
  Magnus Kronborg (CB) (to  HC Midtjylland)
  Hakan Sahin (P) (to  TMS Ringsted)

References

External links
 Nordsjælland Håndbold

Danish handball clubs